Emma King may refer to:

 Emma King (cricketer) (born 1992), Australian cricketer
 Emma King (footballer) (born 1994), Australian rules footballer
 Emma B. King (1857–1933), American impressionist painter